St. Peter's Church is a Franciscan church in the historical part of Jaffa, now part of Tel Aviv-Yafo, Israel.

History

Ottoman period
The church was built in 1654 and dedicated to Saint Peter, over a medieval citadel that was erected by Frederick I and restored by Louis IX of France at the beginning of the second half of the thirteenth century. 
However, in the late eighteenth century the church was twice destroyed and consequently twice rebuilt. The current structure was built between 1888 and 1894 and most recently renovated in 1903.

Today
Masses are conducted in English, Spanish, Polish, and Hebrew. A schedule is available at the church and it is open to the public every day. Among contemporary worshippers are Polish foreign workers who come here to pray on Saturdays, their day off.

Architecture

With its tall, brick façade and towering bell tower, St. Peter's Church is the single largest and most distinctive building in Old Jaffa. The interior of the church is reminiscent of cathedrals in Europe, with a high vaulted ceiling, stained glass, and marble walls. The stained glass was manufactured in Munich by renowned artist Franz Xaver Zettler. The four panels in the interior of the church depict episodes from the life of St. Peter, including the miraculous catch of fishes, the giving of the keys, the transfiguration of Jesus on Mount Tabor and the washing of the feet at the Last Supper. With the exception of depictions of Tabitha, Francis of Assisi, and the Immaculate Conception, all of the other windows in the church depict Spanish saints, which is unsurprising since the present building was erected by the Spanish Empire. Also of note is the pulpit which is carved in the shape of a lifelike tree.

St. Peter's Church also contains thirteenth century remnants of St. Louis' citadel located outside and to the right of the sacristy. The remnants include two whole rooms which are circular in shape, have low ceilings and fire embrasures. It is in these rooms that Napoleon is said to have lived while he was at St. Peter's in 1799 during the French campaign in Egypt and Syria.

Significance
The church was constructed on its present location because of the significance Jaffa has to Christianity. It was in Jaffa that Saint Peter raised Tabitha, one of Jesus' disciples, from the dead according to the Acts of the Apostles, . The church is dedicated to him.

Since the large church is located on a hill near the shore, the building has historically dominated the view of Jaffa from the sea, thus serving as a beacon to pilgrims, signaling that the Holy Land is near.

Gallery

See also
St. Peter's Basilica
Church of the Primacy of St. Peter
Church of St. Peter in Gallicantu
Church of the Transfiguration

References

TelAvivYafo PeterChurch
PeterChurch
European-Israeli culture in Tel Aviv
TelAvivYafo PeterChurch
Old Jaffa
Polish diaspora in Israel
TelAvivYafo PeterChurch